The 2009 NCAA Division I Men's Golf Championship was a golf tournament contested from May 26 to May 30, 2009 at the Inverness Club in Toledo, Ohio. It was the 71st NCAA Division I Men's Golf Championship. The team championship was won by the Texas A&M Aggies who won their first national championship by defeating the Arkansas Razorbacks in the championship match play round 3–2. This was the first tournament to feature a match play playoff to determine the national champion. The individual national championship was won by Matt Hill from North Carolina State University.

Venue

This was the second NCAA Division I Men's Golf Championship held at the Inverness Club in Toledo, Ohio. The first was won by Notre Dame in 1944.

References

NCAA Men's Golf Championship
Golf in Ohio
NCAA Division I Men's Golf Championship
NCAA Division I Men's Golf Championship
NCAA Division I Men's Golf Championship
NCAA Division I Men's Golf Championship